Glenda may refer to:

 Glenda (given name)
 Glenda (musician) (born 1988), Cuban singer, songwriter, and flute player
 Glenda, the Plan 9 Bunny, mascot of Plan 9 from Bell Labs
 Tropical Storm Glenda, various storms, including hurricanes and cyclones named Glenda

See also
 Glen or Glenda, a film by Ed Wood
 Glinda the Good Witch, character from Oz books and related media